Global Church Network is an incorporated educational, networking and strategic resource for evangelical leadership. The headquarters is in Melbourne, Florida.

History 
It was founded in 2002 by Bill Bright, the late founder and chairman of Campus Crusade for Christ, and James O. Davis, founder of Cutting Edge International. Over the next decade GPN hopes to help five million churches to be planted and, in their own words, "win 1 billion people to Christ worldwide". It is based in Orlando, Florida, and boasts 800,000 members worldwide.

In 2003, it had 800,000 members, and Billion Soul Network formed in 2007, with a membership of 475,000 churches worldwide.

Former NYC Mayor, Rudy Giuliani, has been a conference speaker and proponent of the movement.

Driving forces propelling the movement forward include conferences, books and significant prayer initiatives.

Over two hundred church denominations now participate in the movement.

Mission and strategic approach
GPN's current mission is "Helping to network, train and focus the church for the fulfilment of the Great Commission". It has a goal of carrying out that vision to the extent that five million churches are planted around the world and a billion people are converted.

GPN offers curriculum to help church pastors develop ministry skills, Biblical knowledge, and spiritual maturity.  It helps provide its members with information and networking on church planting issues, and provides resources for participatory churches.

Bishop Kenneth Ulmer of Faith Central said "We have been given the opportunity to reach, win and disciple a billion souls for Jesus Christ."

Partners
GPN has a partner organization, Global Pastors Wives Network, that provides similar support to the wives of men in church planting and evangelical ministries.

Key people
James O. Davis, president

Notable events

Billion Soul Pastors Conference
On January 31, 2006, GPN made mention in Time when it met with presidential hopeful Rudy Giuliani at the Global Pastors Network Billion Soul Pastors Conference.  A surprise guest, he said he depended on his faith in God and people in the 9/11 events. "Strong beliefs guide countries – and churches", he said. "I know many of the men who died on 9/11 came from religious homes where they were taught there is no greater principle than to lay down your life for another," Giuliani later added.  Held on January 25–27 at Faith Assembly Church in Orlando, over 2,000 pastors and business leaders were in attendance.  Bill Bright's widow Vonnette also spoke, reminding the assembly of her late husband's commitment to evangelism.  Represented among the business sector speakers were Al Weiss, president of worldwide operations for Disney, and S. Truett Cathy, founder of Chick-fil-A.  The network made plans to organize a Billion Soul Sunday, a day of worldwide prayer for a billion souls to be saved.

Billion Soul Sunday
On September 17, 2006, the Billion Soul Sunday event was simulcast via the web.

Soul Millionaires
'Soul Millionaires' was scheduled for January 29–31, 2008, also in Orlando.

See also
Campus Crusade for Christ
Million Man March
Promise Keepers

References

Evangelical parachurch organizations
Christian organizations established in 2002
Christianity in Orlando, Florida
Organizations based in Florida
Promise Keepers
Christian movements